St Andrews Anglican Church is a heritage-listed churchyard at 160 Vulture Street, South Brisbane, City of Brisbane, Queensland, Australia. It was designed by  Andrea Stombuco and built from 1878 to 1932. It was added to the Queensland Heritage Register on 21 October 1992.

History 
St Andrew's Anglican Church at South Brisbane was constructed in several stages: 1878-1883, 1887, and 1931-1932, as funds became progressively available.

The first Anglican church in South Brisbane, St Thomas',  had been built  on the corner of Grey and Melbourne Streets. The construction of St Andrew's reflected the growing population of the area and the general move of residential and public buildings up the hill away from the flood-prone area of first settlement. Flamboyant Italian architect Andrea Stombuco was commissioned to design St Andrew's, which was to be a substantial structure in stone. Stombuco, who had designed a number of ecclesiastical buildings for the Catholic Church, including St Joseph's Christian Brothers' College on Gregory Terrace (1875-1876), Rathbawn (a house built for Roman Catholic Bishop of Brisbane, James Quinn) at Nudgee (1875-1878) and St Mary's Roman Catholic Presbytery in Ipswich (1875), envisaged a grand structure for St Andrew's, with a prominent tower and spire.

The foundation stone for St Andrew's was laid on Saturday 30 November 1878 by Queensland Governor Arthur Kennedy. Work commenced in 1878, but was abandoned when the walls had reached a height of only . Stombuco's design had proved beyond the financial means of the parish, and work did not resume until 1882. The chancel, transepts and first bay of the nave were completed in the following year by the builder James O'Keeffe. The church was officially opened and dedicated on Wednesday 6 June 1883 by Bishop Matthew Hale assisted by Archdeacon Benjamin Glennie with over 500 people present.

An 1887 extension was designed by architect Hezekiah Watson King Martin, who had recently arrived in Brisbane from London, and was an active member of the St Andrew's congregation.

In 1887, architect John H. Buckeridge designed the rectory for St Andrew’s Church and also extensions to it in 1892. The rectory was later relocated to 112 Airlie Road, Pullenvale and is used as a private home.

The parish hall was built in 1909 to a design by architect William Alfred Caldwell.

The continued growth in the congregation led to the completion of the nave in 1931-1932, under the supervision of architect Lange Leopold Powell. The tower and spire of Stombuco's design were never completed.

Description 
St Andrews is a large Gothic-style church, cruciform in shape and made of Brisbane tuff.

In addition to the nave and transepts there is a portico at the front and a chancel at the western end. Both of these wings have a lower roof line than the nave. A small vestry is located to the north of the chancel and the half-built tower is to the south. There is a substantial subfloor beneath the church. The steeply pitched gable roof is of slate.

A notable feature of the building is the large stained glass windows, especially those located at the end of the chancel, portico and transepts.

The timber hall consists of a core surrounded by enclosed verandah wings. The core has a steeply pitched gable roof in corrugated iron and fine timber ceiling supported by timber trusses.

Heritage listing 
St Andrews Anglican Church was listed on the Queensland Heritage Register on 21 October 1992 having satisfied the following criteria.

The place is important in demonstrating the evolution or pattern of Queensland's history.

St Andrew's Anglican Church is significant historically in demonstrating the expansion of the Anglican Church in Queensland, and the evolution of South Brisbane as a rival to North Brisbane in terms of commerce, municipal development and population increase, in the second half of the 19th century. The construction of St Andrew's illustrates the move away from the river flats after the 1860s flood, and the growing popularity among the middle-class of the higher ridges in South Brisbane and Highgate Hill.

The place demonstrates rare, uncommon or endangered aspects of Queensland's cultural heritage.

The place is important as a rare example of a substantial, stone gothic-style church in Brisbane, with particularly fine stained glass windows, and is a well-known South Brisbane landmark which has contributed to the Brisbane townscape for over a century.

The place is important in demonstrating the principal characteristics of a particular class of cultural places.

The place is important as a rare example of a substantial, stone gothic-style church in Brisbane, with particularly fine stained glass windows, and is a well-known South Brisbane landmark which has contributed to the Brisbane townscape for over a century.

The place is important because of its aesthetic significance.

The place is important as a rare example of a substantial, stone gothic-style church in Brisbane, with particularly fine stained glass windows, and is a well-known South Brisbane landmark which has contributed to the Brisbane townscape for over a century.

The place has a strong or special association with a particular community or cultural group for social, cultural or spiritual reasons.

The place is important as a rare example of a substantial, stone gothic-style church in Brisbane, with particularly fine stained glass windows, and is a well-known South Brisbane landmark which has contributed to the Brisbane townscape for over a century.

The place has a special association with the life or work of a particular person, group or organisation of importance in Queensland's history.

Despite having been constructed in a number of stages between 1878 and 1932, the building reflects much of architect Andrea Stombuco's original vision, and is important in contributing to our understanding of his work.

References

Attribution

External links

 

Queensland Heritage Register
Andrea Stombuco buildings
Anglican church buildings in Brisbane
South Brisbane, Queensland
John H. Buckeridge church buildings
Articles incorporating text from the Queensland Heritage Register
19th-century churches in Australia